Walk Around the Moon is the tenth studio album by Dave Matthews Band, and will be released on May 19, 2023. The album is their first since 2018's Come Tomorrow.

Recording
Work started during the COVID-19 pandemic, with recording sessions taking place with limited band members at a time at the band's Haunted Hollow Studio in Charlottesville, VA.

Seven of the 12 tracks on Walk Around the Moon were played live prior to the official album announcement on January 24, 2023. "Break Free" has been played going back to 2006, from a studio session with Mark Batson. "Singing From the Windows" debuted in Dave Matthews' first performance of the pandemic, a "Pay It Forward" live charity stream sponsored by Verizon Wireless, on March 26, 2020.  "The Ocean and the Butterfly" debuted on a charity livestream in December 2020. "Walk Around the Moon", "The Only Thing", and "Madman's Eyes" were first played live during the band's 2021 tour. "Something to Tell My Baby" made its debut during Dave Matthews and Tim Reynolds' 2022 Mexico three-night run.

Track listing
The track listing for the album was announced on January 24, 2023.

Personnel
Dave Matthews Band
 Carter Beauford – drums, percussion
 Jeff Coffin – tenor saxophone, baritone saxophone, soprano saxophone
 Stefan Lessard – bass guitar
 Dave Matthews – vocals, acoustic guitars, electric guitars, guitars, baritone guitars
 Tim Reynolds – electric guitars, guitars
 Rashawn Ross – trumpet, flugelhorn, bass trumpet, horn arrangements, backing vocals
 Buddy Strong – piano, keyboards
Additional musicians

 Charlie Bisharat – violin (track 2)
 Jacob Braun – viola (track 2)
 Dave Campbell – conductor (track 2)
 Susan Chatman – violin (track 2)
 Giovanna Clayton – cello (track 2)
 Mario de Leon – violin (track 2)
 Andrew Duckels – viola (track 2)
 Thomas Evans – trombone (track 2)
 Alma Fernandez – viola (track 2)
 Thomas Harte Jr. – bass guitar (track 2)
 Paula Hochhalter – cello (track 2)
 Julie Jung – cello (track 2)
 Suzie Katayama – cello (track 2)
 Marisa Kuney – violin (track 2)
 Ana Landauer – violin (track 2)
 Luke Maurer – viola (track 2)
 Alyssa Park – violin (track 2)
 Kerenza Peacock – violin (track 2)
 Sara Perkins – violin (track 2)
 Michele Richards – violin (track 2)
 Tereza Stanislauv – violin (track 2)
 Jennifer Takamatsu – violin (track 2)
 Josefina Vergara – viola (track 2)
 Rodney Wirtz – viola (track 2)

Technical personnel
 Executive producer – John Alagía

References

2023 albums
Albums produced by John Alagía
Albums produced by Mark Batson
Albums produced by Rob Cavallo
Dave Matthews Band albums
RCA Records albums